Sepikea is a genus of flowering plants belonging to the family Gesneriaceae.

Its native range is New Guinea.

Species
Species:
 Sepikea cylindrocarpa Schltr.

References

Didymocarpoideae
Gesneriaceae genera